Blade is a 1998 American superhero film directed by Stephen Norrington and written by David S. Goyer, based on the Marvel Comics superhero of the same name created by Marv Wolfman and Gene Colan. It is the first installment in the Blade trilogy. The film stars Wesley Snipes as the titular character with Stephen Dorff, Kris Kristofferson and N'Bushe Wright in supporting roles. In the film, Blade is a Dhampir, a human with vampire strengths but not their weaknesses, who together with his mentor Abraham Whistler and hematologist Karen Jenson, fights against vampires, namely the exceptionally vicious Deacon Frost.

Blade was released in the United States on August 21, 1998, and was a commercial success, grossing $70 million at the U.S. box office, and $60.2 million worldwide. Despite mixed reviews from film critics, the film received a positive reception from audiences and has since garnered a cult following.  It is also hailed as one of Snipes' signature roles.

Blade was noted as a dark superhero film for its time, as well as being Marvel's first successful film and setting the stage for further comic book film adaptations. It was followed by two sequels, Blade II (2002) and Blade: Trinity (2004), both written by Goyer who also directed the latter.

Plot
In 1967, a pregnant woman is attacked by a vampire, causing her to go into premature labor. Doctors are able to save her baby, but the woman dies.

Thirty years later, the child has become the vampire hunter, Blade, who is a human-vampire hybrid that possesses the supernatural abilities of the vampires without any of their weaknesses, except for the requirement to consume human blood. Blade raids a rave club owned by the vampire Deacon Frost. Police take one of the vampires to the hospital, where he kills Dr. Curtis Webb and feeds on hematologist Karen Jenson, and escapes. Blade takes Karen to a safe house where she is treated by his old friend Abraham Whistler. Whistler explains that he and Blade have been waging a secret war against vampires using weapons based on their elemental weaknesses, such as sunlight, silver, and garlic. As Karen is now "marked" by the bite of a vampire, both he and Blade tell her to leave the city.

At a meeting of the council of pure-blood vampire elders, Frost, the leader of a faction of younger vampires, is rebuked for trying to incite war between vampires and humans. As Frost and his kind are not natural-born vampires, they are considered socially inferior. Meanwhile, returning to her apartment, Karen is attacked by police officer Krieger, who is a familiar, a human loyal to vampires. Blade subdues Krieger and uses information from him to locate an archive that contains pages from the "vampire bible".

Krieger informs Frost of what happened, and Frost kills Krieger. Frost also has one of the elders executed and strips the others of their authority, in response to the earlier disrespect shown him at the council of vampires. Meanwhile Blade comes upon Pearl, a morbidly obese vampire, and tortures him with a UV light into revealing that Deacon wants to command a ritual where he would use 12 pure-blood vampires to awaken the "blood god" La Magra; and Blade's blood is the key.

Later, at the hideout, Blade injects himself with a special serum that suppresses his urge to drink blood. However, the serum is beginning to lose its effectiveness due to overuse. While experimenting with the anticoagulant EDTA as a possible replacement, Karen discovers that it explodes when combined with vampire blood. She manages to synthesize a vaccine that can cure the infected but learns that it will not work on Blade. Karen is confident that she can cure Blade's bloodthirst but it would take her years of treating it.

Frost and his men attack the hideout, infect Whistler, and abduct Karen. When Blade returns, he helps Whistler commit suicide. When Blade attempts to rescue Karen from Frost's penthouse, he is shocked to find his still-alive mother, who reveals that she came back the night she was attacked and was brought in by Frost, who appears and reveals himself as the vampire who bit her. Blade is then subdued and taken to the Temple of Eternal Night, where Frost plans to perform the summoning ritual for La Magra. Karen is thrown into a pit to be devoured by Webb, who has transformed into a decomposing zombie-like creature. Karen injures Webb and escapes. Blade is drained of his blood, but Karen allows him to drink from her, enabling him to recover. Frost completes the ritual and obtains the powers of La Magra. Blade confronts Frost after killing all of his minions, including his mother. During their fight, Blade injects Frost with all of the syringes; the overdose of EDTA causes his body to inflate and explode, killing him.

Karen offers to help Blade cure himself; instead, he asks her to create an improved version of the serum, so he can continue his crusade against vampires. In a brief epilogue, Blade confronts a vampire in Moscow.

Cast

 Wesley Snipes as Eric Brooks / Blade: A half-vampire "daywalker" (a Dhampir) who hunts vampires. Blade is highly-skilled in martial arts and always equips himself with vampire-killing weapons.
 Stephen Dorff as Deacon Frost: An upstart vampire with great ambitions and influence. He emerges as Blade's primary enemy and also wants to conquer the human race.
 Kris Kristofferson as Abraham Whistler: Blade's mentor, father figure and weaponsmith
 N'Bushe Wright as Dr. Karen Jenson: A hematologist/serologist who is bitten by a vampire. She stays with Blade to remain safe while she finds a cure for herself and eventually becomes his partner in fighting Deacon Frost's party.
 Donal Logue as Quinn: A cocky minion of Frost's, capable of surviving wounds that kill lesser vampires.
 Udo Kier as Gitano Dragonetti: A vampire elder.
 Traci Lords as Racquel: A seductive vampire who leads a man to the blood rave.
 Arly Jover as "Mercury": A fleet-footed vampire and one of Frost's multiple lovers.
 Kevin Patrick Walls as Officer Krieger: A "familiar", or human servant, of Frost's.
 Tim Guinee as Dr. Curtis Webb: Karen's ex-boyfriend, who is killed by Quinn and later becomes a zombie-like creature, instead of a vampire (like most people bitten by a vampire would).  
 Sanaa Lathan as Vanessa Brooks: Blade's mother, who has become a vampire.
 Eric Edwards as Pearl: a morbidly obese vampire.

Additionally, Stephen Norrington portrayed Michael Morbius in a deleted scene.

Production

Background
The character Blade was created in 1973 for Marvel Comics by the writer Marv Wolfman and artist Gene Colan as a supporting character in the 1970s comic The Tomb of Dracula. The comic Blade used teakwood knives and was much more the everyman in his behavior and attitude. Though courageous and brave, he displayed flaws as well, such as an inability to get along with certain other supporting cast members and a hatred of vampires that bordered on fanaticism.

The character was not originally a "daywalker" but a human being immune to being turned into a vampire. Lacking the superhuman speed and strength of his undead quarry, he relied solely on his wits and skill until he was bitten by the character Morbius as seen in Peter Parker: Spider-Man #8, first published in August 1999. The film portrayal of Blade was updated for a 1990s audience and the comics character was subsequently modified to match. Goyer replaced the daggers Blade used in the comics with a sword and gave him a more samurai-like aesthetic. The film's version of Deacon Frost also differs greatly from his comic counterpart. He was older with white hair and literally a church deacon, but the film retains Frost's upstart ambitions.

Development 
When New World Pictures bought the rights to Marvel Comics, they were set to make a Mexico-set western starring Richard Roundtree as the vampire hunter. Marvel Studios then started to develop the film in early 1992, when rapper/actor LL Cool J was interested in playing the lead role. Blade was eventually set up at New Line Cinema, with David S. Goyer writing the script. When Goyer heard a film was in development he went in to pitch with director Ernest Dickerson. New Line originally wanted to do Blade as "something that was almost a spoof" before the writer convinced them otherwise. At one point, the studio even asked if Blade could be white. Goyer wanted to take the character seriously, and ground them in a sense of reality with vampirism as a biological disease. He even pitched a trilogy of movies "almost Wagnerian in scope". He also wanted to demystify the vampires and treat them as serious villains with a greater sense of realism instead of the doomed romantic characters shown in Anne Rice's Interview with the Vampire. Goyer's drafts early drafts predated but took a similar post-modern approach as the films From Dusk till Dawn and Vampire in Brooklyn.
After failing to get a Black Panther film into production, in 1996 Wesley Snipes signed on to star as Blade.

Casting
When Goyer first pitched the idea of doing a Blade film, Mike DeLuca, head of New Line, suggested Denzel Washington, Wesley Snipes, and Laurence Fishburne, but to Goyer, Snipes was always the perfect choice for Blade. The finalized script was sent to Snipes and no other actor was seriously considered.

Patrick McGoohan was the first choice to play Whistler, as Stephen Norrington was a fan of The Prisoner (1967). Jon Voight was also considered for the role.

Filming
Blade was produced on a budget of $45 million and principal photography commenced on February 5, 1997, in large part done in Los Angeles, with some scenes being shot in Death Valley. All sets were constructed, and all on-set filming occurred, in what was formerly the Redken Shampoo factory in Canoga Park. The effects for the film were done by Flat Earth Productions.

Post-production
The first cut of the film was 140 minutes long. It had a disastrous test screening with audiences. Heavy edits and re-shoots were implemented which delayed the release date for more than half a year. The most significant change was the addition of the final sword fight between Blade and Deacon Frost, which did not exist in the original cut. In the original ending, Frost turned into La Magra and became a large swirling mass of blood instead of keeping his form. This was scrapped because the filmmakers could not get the special effects to look right. It can be seen as a special feature on the DVD. Stan Lee originally had a cameo that was ultimately cut from the film. He played one of the cops that came into the blood club during the aftermath and discover Quinn's body on fire. The scene where Karen and Deacon are talking about the cure for vampirism initially ran slightly longer and answered the question of how the vampires would feed if everybody was turned into a vampire. They would keep some humans alive in giant blood bags to harvest them. The bags can still be seen in a doorway during the scene, and later played an integral part of the plot in Blade: Trinity.

Marvel was not going to give Marv Wolfman and Gene Colan credit for the characters they had created, but Goyer insisted. He asked New Line and they accepted, but representatives of Marv Wolfman said only he should get credit, and not Gene Colan. Goyer insisted that both be credited.

Music

A soundtrack containing hip hop music was released on August 25, 1998, by TVT Records and Epic Records. It peaked at #36 on the Billboard 200 and #28 on the Top R&B/Hip-Hop Albums. The British techno band The Prodigy was approached to do the soundtrack and score to the film but had to turn down the offer due to other commitments.

Release

Theatrical
Blade was Marvel's first box office success, and set the stage for further comic film adaptations. Blade followed Howard the Duck as the second Marvel property to get a wide theatrical release in the United States.

Home media
Blade was first released on DVD and VHS on December 1, 1998. The DVD is part of New Line Cinema's Platinum Series DVD brand. 
It was released in Ultra HD Blu-ray on December 1, 2020.

Lawsuit
Marv Wolfman unsuccessfully sued Marvel, New Line, and Time Warner for $35 million after the release of the film, claiming he was not bound by a work for hire contract when he created the character in 1972. He, along with artist Gene Colan, received a "based on characters created by" credit in this film.

Reception

Box office
The film went to number one in both Spain and Australia for their opening weekends. With 200 theaters showing the film, Spain's filmgoers earned the film $1.5 million (US) in three days, whilst Australia earned $1 million from 132 cinemas showing the film. In the Flemish Region of Belgium, the film earned $323,000 from 20 cinemas, and the Netherlands earned the film $246,000 from 44 cinemas. France made $1.9 million in five days from 241 cinemas, but the film was less successful in Hong Kong (with $182,000 from 22 cinemas) and South Africa ($159,000 from 64 cinemas). The United Kingdom was more successful, taking in $5.7 million over 10 days, as was Brazil, making $855,000 in four days from 133 cinemas. The film was banned from showing in Malaysia, widely considered to have the most controlling censors in Southeast Asia. Despite the success of the film Marvel shared only a flat fee of $25,000.

Critical response
On Rotten Tomatoes, the film has an approval rating of 57% based on 107 reviews, with an average rating of 5.92/10. The site's critics consensus states: "Though some may find the plot a bit lacking, Blades action is fierce, plentiful, and appropriately stylish for a comic book adaptation." On Metacritic, the film has a weighted average score of 47 out of 100 based on review from 23 critics, indicating "mixed or average reviews". Audiences polled by CinemaScore gave the film an average grade of "A-" on an A+ to F scale.

Roger Ebert gave the film 3 stars out of 4, writing: "Blade ... is a movie that relishes high visual style. It uses the extreme camera angles, the bizarre costumes and sets, the exaggerated shadows, the confident cutting between long shots and extreme closeups. It slams ahead in pure visceral imagery". James Berardinelli gave the film 2½ stars out of 4, writing: "Blade has the capacity to dazzle, but it also will leave many viewers dissatisfied". Berardinelli also wrote: "Blade opens brilliantly, with a series of fast-paced, visually-engaging scenes that display the seedy underbelly of vampire society and introduce the implacable title character in true superhero fashion. For about its first hour, the movie offers violent, visceral, rapid fire entertainment that concentrates as much on developing a distinctive atmosphere as on advancing a minimalist storyline. Unfortunately [...] it keeps going and going, eventually wearing out its welcome". Dennis Harvey of Variety wrote: "Though slick and diverting in some aspects, increasingly silly pic has trouble meshing disparate elements -- horror, superhero fantasy, straight-up action -- into a workable whole". John Krewson of The A.V. Club was critical of the story and the dialogue, but praised the "creative cinematography and non-stop, decently choreographed gratuitous violence".

Critics such as A. Asbjørn Jøn have noted not only the important place of Blade in the wider vampire genre but also possible intertextual links between the Whistler character and a character named Whistler in A Dozen Black Roses (1996) by Nancy A. Collins, as they possess "striking similarities in role, dramatic focus, visual appearance, and sharing the name".

Video game

A video game prequel was published and released by Activision in 2000. The game received mixed reviews. On Metacritic it received a weighted average score 51% based on reviews from 11 critics, indicating "mixed or average reviews". A separate game for the Game Boy Color was also released.

Sequels

The success of the film led to two sequels, Blade II in 2002, Blade Trinity in 2004, and a television series.

Legacy

In August 2014, Snipes spoke about his desire to return to the franchise: "I'd be open to it. I think we've got some stones left unturned and there's some latitude left for us to build on and I'd love to get back in the suit again and do some things I've learned how to do now that I didn't know how to do then".

During their 2019 San Diego Comic-Con presentation, Marvel Studios announced a Blade reboot set in the Marvel Cinematic Universe, with Mahershala Ali starring as Blade. Some fans of Snipes were disappointed but Snipes expressed his support for Ali saying he would "do great".

In 2021, Marvel published The Darkhold: Blade one-shot written by Daniel Kibblesmith, presenting an alternate ending to the film, where Deacon Frost succeeded in his plans at using his power attained as avatar of La Magra to turn billions of humans around the world into vampires.

See also

 Afrofuturism in film
 Rise: Blood Hunter
 Vampire Assassin
 Vampire films

References

External links

 Official website
 
 
 
 
 
 Blade at Marvel.com
 Blade turns Ten. Interviews with the cast members from the movie

Blade (comics) films
Blade (franchise)
1998 films
1998 horror films
1990s science fiction action films
1998 fantasy films
1998 action thriller films
1990s superhero films
1990s monster movies
American superhero films
Afrofuturist films
American action thriller films
American science fiction action films
American fantasy films
African-American films
1990s English-language films
1990s chase films
Fictional-language films
Films scored by Mark Isham
American films about revenge
Films directed by Stephen Norrington
Films produced by Peter Frankfurt
Films produced by Wesley Snipes
Films set in 1967
Films set in 1997
Films set in Los Angeles
Films set in Moscow
Films shot in Moscow
Films shot in Vancouver
Kung fu films
Martial arts horror films
Superhero horror films
American neo-noir films
New Line Cinema films
Films with screenplays by David S. Goyer
American vampire films
American action horror films
American vigilante films
American chase films
Matricide in fiction
African-American horror films
African-American superhero films
American splatter films
1990s American films
Live-action films based on Marvel Comics